LAMPA (N-methyl-N-propyl lysergamide) is a structural analogue of lysergic acid diethylamide (LSD) that has been studied as a potential treatment for alcoholism. In animal studies, LAMPA was found to be nearly equipotent to ECPLA and MIPLA for inducing a head-twitch response. LAMPA appears to be significantly less potent than LSD in humans, producing little to no noticeable effects at doses of 100 µg.

See also 
 ECPLA
 MIPLA

References 

 Lysergamides